Konarak may refer to:

 Konarak, Iran, a city in Sistan and Baluchestan Province, Iran
 Konarak, Iranshahr, a village in Sistan and Baluchestan Province, Iran
 Konarak-e Beyahi, a village in Hormozgan Province, Iran
 Konarak-e Bala, a village in Chaharmahal and Bakhtiari Province, Iran
 Konarak-e Pain, a village in Chaharmahal and Bakhtiari Province, Iran
 Konarak County, an administrative subdivision of Iran
 Konarak, an alternative spelling for the Indian city of Konark
 Konark Sun Temple, Orissa, India
 Iranian support vessel Konarak, a vessel of the Iranian Navy, involved in a friendly fire incident in May 2020